Alana Martins Maldonado (born 27 July 1995) is a visually impaired Brazilian Paralympic judoka. She won the gold medal in the women's 70 kg event at the 2020 Summer Paralympics held in Tokyo, Japan. She also represented Brazil at the 2016 Summer Paralympics in Rio de Janeiro, Brazil and she won the silver medal in the women's 70 kg event.

She won the silver medal in the women's 70 kg event at the 2015 Parapan American Games held in Toronto, Canada and at the 2019 Parapan American Games held in Lima, Peru.

References

External links 

 

Living people
1995 births
Place of birth missing (living people)
Brazilian female judoka
Judoka at the 2016 Summer Paralympics
Judoka at the 2020 Summer Paralympics
Medalists at the 2016 Summer Paralympics
Medalists at the 2020 Summer Paralympics
Paralympic judoka of Brazil
Paralympic gold medalists for Brazil
Paralympic silver medalists for Brazil
Paralympic medalists in judo
Medalists at the 2015 Parapan American Games
Medalists at the 2019 Parapan American Games
21st-century Brazilian women